Khushbir Singh Shaad (Urdu: خوشبیر سنگھ شاد) (Hindi:खुशबीर सिंह 'शाद') is an Indian Urdu Shayar (poet) with seven books of Urdu Ghazals to his credit published in Devnagri and Urdu language.
Born on 04 Sep 1954 (Sitapur) Uttar Pradesh, to Late Sri. Rawail Singh Hora & Smt Joginder Kaur Hora. He is an alumnus of Christ Church College, City Montessori School & KKV Lucknow.

Poetry
Acting upon suggestion of his 'Ustaad' Wali Aasi, he learned Urdu script around the time his first book  (Jaane Kab Yeh Mausam Badle) was released.
Shaad has also penned verses for the title song of Bollywood film - Dhokha made by film maker Mahesh Bhatt. 
He has been participating in many Mushaira(s) of note such as Jashn-e-Bahar Delhi, Indo-Pak Friendship Mushaira, Dallas International Mushaira, 7th International Urdu Conference (Karachi, Pakistan), International Urdu Mushaira (Abu Dhabi)

Books
Jaane Kab Yeh Mausam Badle (1992)
Geeli Mitti (1998)
Chalo Kuch Rang Hi Bikhrey (2000)
Zara Yeh Dhoop Dhal Jaye (2005)
Bekhawabiyan (2007)
Jahan Tak Zindagi Hai (2009)
Bikharne Se Zara Pehle (2011)
Lahoo Ki Dhoop (2012)
Baat Andar ke Mausam Ki (2014)
Shehar Ke Shor se Juda (2017)
Halat Kuch Alag Si (2018)
Hawa Patte Udati Ja Rahi Hai (2019)
Ek Hi Chehra tha Ghar MeiN (2019)
Khushbir Singh Shaad Diyan Chonvian Gazlan (2019) - collection of Ghazal selected by Kuknus Publishers in Punjabi transcript
Aabyari Dard Ki (2019)

Awards
Yash Bharti Award (2014)

Jash E Adab Aijaz Award (2015)

Lala Jagat Narayan Sammaan Punjab (2017)

References

 

Living people
Urdu-language poets from India
Year of birth missing (living people)